Sir Mark Andrew Lowcock  (born 25 July 1962) is a British economist and accountant who served as the United Nations Under-Secretary-General for Humanitarian Affairs and Emergency Relief Coordinator (the head of the United Nations Office for the Coordination of Humanitarian Affairs) between 2017 and 2021. Prior to his appointment by United Nations Secretary-General António Guterres on 12 May 2017, Lowcock was the Permanent Secretary of the Department for International Development (DFID) from June 2011 to September 2017. He is currently a visiting professor in practice at the Department of International Development at the London School of Economics and Distinguished Non-Resident Fellow at the Center for Global Development in Washington, DC. He is also a Trustee/Director and Vice-Chair of The Howard Partnership Trust, a multi-academy trust of schools (including for children with learning disabilities) in Surrey.

Early life and education
Lowcock attended Culford School in Suffolk before attending Oxford University, where he graduated with a degree in economics and history. He was later awarded a Master’s degree in economics from Birkbeck College, University of London, before moving to Boston to study economics and business as a graduate fellow. He is a qualified accountant and a member of the Chartered Institute of Public Finance and Accountancy.

Professional career

Career in the UK
Lowcock joined the then Overseas Development Administration in 1985. He was the private secretary to Minister for Overseas Development Baroness Chalker of Wallasey from 1992 to 1994, the deputy head and head of the Department for International Development Regional Office for Central Africa from 1994 to 1997, the head of European Union Department from 1997 to 1999, the head of the Regional Office for East Africa, the director of finance and corporate performance from 2001 to 2003, the director general of corporate performance and knowledge sharing from 2003 to 2006, the director general of policy and international from 2006 to 2008, the director general of country programmes from 2008 to 2011.

Lowcock was appointed Permanent Secretary of the Department for International Development on 9 June 2011.

He has made speeches on development, in Delhi (on the future of international development), Karachi (on how to get economic growth in a changing world), Berlin (on development agencies and conflict) and Addis Ababa (on economic development in Ethiopia). As of 2015, Lowcock was paid a salary of between £160,000 and £164,999 by the department, making him one of the 328 most highly paid people in the British public sector at that time.

Lowcock oversaw the department during the period in which the UK increased its aid budget to 0.7% of Gross Domestic Product. World leaders first pledged to meet the 0.7% target 35 years ago in a 1970 General Assembly Resolution.

Career with the UN
As the under-secretary-general and emergency relief coordinator (USG/ERC), he was responsible for the oversight of all emergencies requiring United Nations humanitarian assistance. He also acted as the central focal point for governmental, intergovernmental and non-governmental relief activities. The ERC also leads the Inter-Agency Standing Committee (IASC), a unique inter-agency forum for coordination, policy development and decision-making involving the key United Nations and non-United Nations humanitarian partners.  In a country affected by a disaster or conflict, the ERC may appoint a humanitarian coordinator (HC) to ensure response efforts are well organized. The HC works with government, international organizations, non-governmental organizations and affected communities

Since 2019, Lowcock has been a member of the World Economic Forum High-Level Group on Humanitarian Investing, co-chaired by Børge Brende, Kristalina Georgieva and Peter Maurer.

COVID-19 Global Humanitarian Response Plan

In his role as the UN’s humanitarian chief Mark Lowcock coordinated the COVID-19 Global Humanitarian Response Plan (GHRP). The GHRP is the international community’s primary fundraising vehicle to respond to the humanitarian impacts of the virus in low- and middle-income countries and support their efforts to fight it. It aggregates relevant COVID-19 appeals from across the UN System, includes inputs from NGOs and NGO consortiums, and reflects local organizations’ role in the response. The GHRP complements other plans such as those developed by the International Red Cross and Red Crescent Movement, the Global Fund’s programme to safeguard work to combat AIDS, tuberculosis and malaria, and the Vaccine Alliance’s (Gavi) work to keep future generations free from measles.

Nearly 250 million acutely vulnerable people across 63 countries are covered by the updated GHRP with needs totaling $10.3 billion. Activity funded by the GHRP includes the delivery of laboratory equipment to test for the virus, and treat those infected, the installation of handwashing stations in camps and settlements, public health information campaigns on how to prevent community transmission, the provision of personal protective equipment (PPE) for front-line medical workers, training for support services around sexual violence and intimate partner violence, the delivery of food and nutrition programmes, and the creation of airbridges across Africa, Asia and Latin America for the movement of humanitarian workers and supplies.

Publishing career 
In August 2020 Troubador Publishing announced the release in January 2021 of Lowcock's book Ten Generations, which they describe as "an extraordinary piece of social and family history". Gordon Brown has praised the book as "... a great achievement ..... eminently readable".

Lowcock has written about his time at the UN in a book, Relief Chief: A Manifesto for Saving Lives in Dire Times, published by the Center for Global Development on May 17, 2022. Rory Stewart described it as "A scrupulously honest, thoughtful testimony on what it takes to fight for effective humanitarian relief by one of the most distinguished international civil servants. Never preaching, avoiding jargon, alert to politics, nuance, and practicality, Lowcock draws strong, impressive, and wise conclusions on how the world could improve its response to the mounting tragedies which surround us."

Other activities
 Trustee, Board member and Council member, Chartered Institute of Public Finance and Accountancy
 Member, Global Preparedness Monitoring Board (WHO pandemic board)
 International Gender Champions (IGC), Member
 Fellow, Birkbeck College 
 Fellow King's College School, Wimbledon
In January 2022 Lowcock was appointed to chair a Public Inquiry into the Sheffield street tree dispute. The inquiry held live-streamed public hearings in the autumn of 2022. Lowcock has said its report will be published by March 2023.

Recognition
In 2011, Lowcock was appointed Companion of the Order of the Bath (CB). In the 2017 New Year Honours, he was appointed Knight Commander of the Order of the Bath (KCB) for public service, particularly to International Development.

Personal life
Lowcock is married to Julia Watson and has three children.

References 
LOWCOCK, Mark Andrew, Who's Who 2015, A & C Black, 2015; online edn, Oxford University Press, 2014

Living people
1962 births
Alumni of Christ Church, Oxford
Alumni of Birkbeck, University of London
Alumni of the University of London
Boston University people
British officials of the United Nations
Knights Commander of the Order of the Bath
People educated at Culford School
Permanent Under-Secretaries of State for International Development